The following is a list of programs currently and formerly broadcast on CMT as of May 2021.

Current programs

Original programming

Music
CMT Crossroads (January 13, 2002)
CMT Music Awards (2001)

Syndicated programming

The Golden Girls (2020–present)
The King of Queens (2020-present)
Last Man Standing (2015–present)
Mike & Molly (2021–present)
Mom (2017; 2019–present)
Reba (2012–present)
Roseanne (2012–present)
Yellowstone (2022-present)
Young Sheldon (2023-present)

Former programming

Original programming

Music

 Can You Duet (April 14, 2008 - June 2009)
CMT #1 Music and a Movie
CMT All Access (1998–2001)
CMT Big 4-0 (2001–02)
CMT Cross Country (2006–07)
CMT Dance Ranch (1993–98)
CMT Delivery Room (1994–2001)
CMT Flameworthy (2002–03)
CMT 3rdshift (2002-2004)
CMT Got Me In With the Band (2002–04)
CMT Greatest Hits (2002–04)
CMT Home Blitz (2005)
CMT Homecoming (2004–06)
CMT Inside Fame (2001–11)
CMT Insider (2004–11)
CMT Insider Special Edition (2004–10)
CMT Invitation Only (2007–11)
CMT Made (2011)
CMT Morning (1997–2001)
CMT Most Shocking (2003–05)
CMT Most Wanted Live (2001–04)
CMT Music
CMT Outlaws (2004–05)
CMT Power Picks (2006–10)
CMT Prime! (2002)
CMT Pure Country Preview (2006)
CMT Showcase (1994–2001)
CMT Signature Series (1994–2002)
CMT Stone Country (1997–2001)
CMT Top 12 Countdown (1994–2001)
CMT's Next Superstar (2011)
CMT's Southern Fried Flicks With Hazel Smith 
Top 20 Countdown (January 3, 2001 - November 30, 2012)

Reality/Lifestyle
Bachelorette Weekend (August 2, 2018 - October 6, 2018)
 Chainsaw Gang (November 10, 2012 - December 31, 2016)
 CMT Comedy Stage (2007)
 Cowboy U (August 29, 2003 - 2007)
 Country Fried Home Videos (2006-2009)
 Dallas Cowboys Cheerleaders: Making the Team (September 29, 2006 - November 27, 2021)
 Dog and Beth: On the Hunt (April 21, 2013 - August 22, 2015)
The Dude Perfect Show (2016)
The Ed Bassmaster Show (2015–16)
 Guntucky (April 21, 2013 - April 26, 2014)
 I Love Kellie Pickler (November 6, 2015 - October 6, 2017)
I Want to Look Like a High School Cheerleader Again
 The Josh Wolf Show (June 11, 2015 - 2016)
 Melissa & Tye (April 20, 2012 - June 8, 2012)
Music City (March 1, 2018 - January 31, 2019)
 My Big Redneck Wedding (January 11, 2008 - March 18, 2011)
My Dysfunctional Family (2014)
Nanny 911 (2009)
Nashville Squares (November 1, 2019 - November 29, 2019) 
 Party Down South (January 16, 2014 - April 14, 2016)
 Party Down South 2 (2014–15)
 Racing Wives (August 2, 2019 - September 20, 2019)
 Redneck Island (June 9, 2012)
 Steve Austin's Broken Skull Challenge (July 6, 2014)
 Tattoo Titans (2014)
World's Strictest Parents (2009-2010)

Scripted
 Bounty Hunters (2013)
 Nashville (2016-2018)
 Still the King (2016-2017)
 Sun Records (2017)
 Working Class (2011)

Acquired programming
1883 (2021) (Special presentation, simulcast with Paramount+ and Paramount Network)
20/20 Crime on CMT
America's Funniest Home Videos (2015–16)
American Housewife (2020–2023)
American Revolutions (2005–06)
Are You Smarter Than a 5th Grader? (2009–12)
Award-Winning Look (2004)
Bandits vs. Smokies
Barely Famous (2004–05)
Bayou Billionaires (2013–16)
Big Texas Heat (2013–16)
Big Ticket (1994–2002)
Bill Engvall's "Here's Your Sign" Awards (2008–present)
Billy Ray Cyrus: Home at Last (2008)
Cassadee Pope: Frame by Frame 
Class Of... (2005)
Controversy (2004)
Country Fried Planet (2008–present)
Country's Hottest Hookups (2003)
Cops Reloaded (2013–2020) 
Cowboy Cool Theater (2003)
Danger Coast
Devoted (2003)
The Drive (2004)
The Dukes of Hazzard (2005–15)
Everybody Loves Raymond (2016)
Extreme Makeover: Home Edition
The Fabulous Life of... (2004)
Face the Music (1999–2001)
Family Feud (Steve Harvey; 2019)
Fast Living (2004)
Fear Factor
Foxworthy's Big Night Out (2006)
Full House (2018)
Gainesville (2015–16)
Gator 911
George Lopez (2015)
Gone Country
Grand Ole Opry Live (2002–03)
The Great Christmas Light Fight (2019)
The Greatest (2002–12)
Hee Haw (2006–07)
Hell's Kitchen
High 5 Video Countdown
Hillbillies for Hire (2013–16)
Hit Trip (1998–2001)
Hogan Knows Best
Home Improvement (2018–2021)
Hulk Hogan's Celebrity Championship Wrestling (2008)
In the Moment (2004–11)
Inside Fame (2001–05)
Jammin' Country (1994–2001)
Jennie Garth: A Little Bit Country (2012) 
Karaoke-Dokey (2007)
King of the Hill (2018-2019)
Kitchen Nightmares 
Life & Times (2001–02)
Making the Video (2002–04)
Malibu Country
Mama's Family (2003-2008)
Married… with Children
Mobile Home Disaster (2008–10)
MWL Star (2003)
My Big Redneck Family (2014–16)
My Big Redneck Vacation (2012)
Nanny 911 (2008–10)
NASCAR: The Rise of American Speed (May 2016)
The New Adventures of Old Christine (2016)
On The Verge (2000–02)
Orange County Choppers (1999–2016)
Personal Playback (2001)
Pickler & Ben (September 18, 2017)
Prankville
Pure 12-Pack Countdown (2006)
Raising Hope (2017)
Redneck Dreams
Redneck Rehab
Reel Eats (2014–16)
Request Line (1997–2001)
Ridiculousness (2019)
Saturday Night Dance Ranch (1994–99)
The Singing Bee
Skinhead Bald Women
Stacked (2006–11)
Star Pads (2002)
Supernanny (2010–12)
Swamp Pawn (2013–16)
Sweet Home Alabama
Texas Justice (2007)
Texas Women 
That '70s Show (2014)
Three Chords from the Truth
Top Secret Recipe (2011)
Top Ten Countdown (2005–11)
Top 20 Countdown
Total Release (2002–05)
Trading Spouses
Trick My Truck
Trick My Trucker
Trick My What? (2011)
True Grit (2006–10)
Ty Murray's Celebrity Bull Riding Challenge
Ultimate Country Home (2003)
The Ultimate Coyote Ugly Search
Ultimate Home (2004)
Unplugged (1989–92)
Video Bio (1999–2001)
Video Confessions (2003)
Walker, Texas Ranger (2019–2021)
Western Beat (2000–01)
Wide Open Country (2005–07)
World's Most Amazing Videos (2012-2013)
Yes, Dear (2012-13; 2021)

References

CMT (American TV channel) original programming
Lists of television series by network